The 2009 Star World Championships were held in Varberg, Sweden between August 2 and 7, 2009.

Results

References

External links
 

Star World Championships
Star World Championships
Sailing competitions in Sweden
Sport in Halland County